The men's singles tennis event was part of the tennis programme and took place between October 8 and 13, at the Hiroshima Regional Park Tennis Stadium.

Schedule
All times are Japan Standard Time (UTC+09:00)

Results

Final

Top half

Bottom half

References 

Page 11
Page 24
Page 26
Page 60
Page 25

Men's singles